The United States Poker Championship (USPC) was a major annual stop on the poker tournament tour. This event was held at the Trump Taj Mahal in Atlantic City, New Jersey. The series started in 1996, took one year off in 1997, and ran every year from 1998–2010. This series of poker tournaments culminated with a $10,000 no-limit Texas hold 'em championship tournament televised by ESPN and commentated by Lon McEachern and Norman Chad. The last time this tournament series was run was 2010.

Main Event Results by Year 

* The final table of the 2007 tournament had only eight players, as Smith was eliminated with another player on the same hand.  Smith had more chips at the time of the hand and therefore the higher finish.

References

Poker tournaments
Atlantic City, New Jersey
Poker in North America